The following lists events that happened during 2000 in New Zealand.

Population
 Estimated population as of 31 December: 3,873,100
 Increase since 31 December 1999: 21,900 (0.57%)
 Males per 100 Females: 96.3

Incumbents

Regal and viceregal
Head of State – Elizabeth II
Governor-General – The Rt Hon. Sir Michael Hardie Boys GNZM, GCMG, QSO

Government
The 46th New Zealand Parliament continued. Government was The Labour Party led by Helen Clark, in coalition with Alliance, led by Jim Anderton.

Speaker of the House – Jonathan Hunt
Prime Minister – Helen Clark
Deputy Prime Minister – Jim Anderton
Minister of Finance – Michael Cullen
Minister of Foreign Affairs – Phil Goff
Chief Justice — Sian Elias

Opposition leaders

See: :Category:Parliament of New Zealand, :New Zealand elections

National – Jenny Shipley (Leader of the Opposition)
Greens – Jeanette Fitzsimons and Rod Donald
Act – Richard Prebble
New Zealand First – Winston Peters
United – Peter Dunne

Main centre leaders
Mayor of Auckland – Christine Fletcher
Mayor of Hamilton – Russell Matthew Remmington
Mayor of Wellington – Mark Blumsky
Mayor of Christchurch – Garry Moore
Mayor of Dunedin – Sukhi Turner

Events

January
 1 January: Broadcasts from the Chatham Islands and the New Zealand mainland are watched worldwide as New Zealand, by virtue of time zone, kicks off the worldwide millennium celebrations.

Arts and literature
James Norcliffe wins the Robert Burns Fellowship.
Montana New Zealand Book Awards:
Montana Medal: Grahame Sydney, The Art of Grahame Sydney
Deutz Medal: Owen Marshall, Harlequin Rex
Reader's Choice: Grahame Sydney, The Art of Grahame Sydney
First Book Awards
Fiction: Duncan Sarkies, Stray Thoughts And Nosebleeds
Poetry: Glenn Colquhoun, The Art of Walking Upright
Non-Fiction: Pether Thomson, Kava in the Blood

See 2000 in art, 2000 in literature, :Category:2000 books

Music

New Zealand Music Awards
This year of awards included a new category, ' Best Film Soundtrack/Cast Recording/Compilation':
Winners are shown first with nominees underneath.
 Album of the Year: Stellar* – Mix
Shihad – The General Electric
Ardijah – Time
Salmonella Dub – Killervision
The Mutton Birds – Rain, Steam and Speed
 Single of the Year: Stellar* – Violent
AKA Brown – Something I Need
Shihad – My Minds Sedate
The Mutton Birds – Pulled Along By Love
Breathe – Landslide
 Top Male Vocalist: Jon Toogood – The General Electric (Shihad)
Dave Dobbyn
Don McGlashan (The Mutton Birds)
 Top Female Vocalist: Boh Runga  – Mix (Stellar*)
Betty-Anne Monga (Ardijah)
Zara Clark (Deep Obsession)
 Top Group: Stellar* – Mix
Shihad – The General Electric
Deep Obsession – Infinity
 Most Promising Male Vocalist: Aaron Tokona (Weta)
Sama Feo (AKA Brown)
Conan Wilcox (Salmonella Dub)
 Most Promising Female Vocalist: Vanessa Kelly – Infinity (Deep Obsession)
Maybelle Galuvao (Ma-V-Elle)
Lavina Williams (The Invasion Band / Ma-V-Elle)
 Most Promising Group: Weta
Breathe
AKA Brown
 International Achievement: Bic Runga
Te Vaka
Shihad
 Best Video: Reuben Sutherland – My Mind's Sedate (Shihad)
Marc Swadel – Birthday (The Stereo Bus)
Jonathan King – Violent (Stellar*)
 Best Producer: Tom Bailey & Stellar* – Mix
Anthony Ioasa – Dream (TrueBliss)
Malcolm Welsford – Landslide (Breathe)
 Best Engineer: Luke Tomes – Mix (Stellar*)
Sam Gibson – Rain Steam & Speed (The Mutton Birds)
Paddy Free & Tiki Taane – Killervision (Salmonella Dub)
 Best Jazz Album: Jason Jones – Subspace
Mark De Clive-Lowe – Six Degrees
Steve Sherriff – See What Happens
 Best Classical Album: John Psathas – Rhythm Spike
NZ National Youth Choir – Winds That Whisper
Gareth Farr / NZSO – Te Papa
 Best Country Album: The Warratahs – One of Two Things
The Minstrel – Blaaack
Rosy Parsons – Pride of Place
 Best Film Soundtrack/Cast Recording/Compilation (new category): Dave Dobbyn – Overnight Success: The Definitive Dave Dobbyn Collection
Various – World Famous in New Zealand
The Exponents – Hello, Love You, Goodbye
 Best Folk Album: –
 Best Gospel Album: The Lads – Lost at Sea
The Invasion Band – Everything
The Parachute Band – Adore
 Best Mana Maori Album: Southside of Bombay – Live in Aotearoa
Maisey Rika – 20 Favourite Maori Songs
Hato Paora College – Hato Paora – 50 Years On
 Best Mana Reo Album: Iwi – Iwi
Maisey Rika – 20 Favourite Maori Songs
Hato Paora College – Hato Paora – 50 Years On
He Taonga Reo – Tahi/Rua'
 Best Children's Album: Jennifer Moss – Jennifer's House
Janet Channon & Wendy Jensen – You've Got to Clap
Janet Grierson and Kidz Choice Singers – Singing Is Fun
Tessarose Productions – Sing A Song About The Body
 Best Songwriter: Boh Runga – Violent (Stellar*)
Salmonella Dub – For The Love of It (Salmonella Dub)
Christopher Bands and Zara Clark – Cold (Deep Obsession)
 Best Cover: Shihad & Karl Kippenberger – The General Electric
Kimberley Renwick – Second Nature (Margaret Urlich)
Gideon Keith and Seven – Infinity (Deep Obsession)
 New Zealand Radio Programmer Award: Grant Hislop – (ZM / Hauraki Auckland)
Martin Good (Hits 89FM)
Rodger Clamp (More FM Auckland)

See: 2000 in music, New Zealand Top 50 Albums of 2000

Performing arts

 Benny Award presented by the Variety Artists Club of New Zealand to Doug Aston.

Radio and television
1 July: Public Broadcasting Fee finishes.  

See: 2000 in New Zealand television, 2000 in television, List of TVNZ television programming, :Category:Television in New Zealand, TV3 (New Zealand), :Category:New Zealand television shows, Public broadcasting in New Zealand

Film
Jubilee
Stickmen
The Lord of the Rings: The Fellowship of the Ring
The Price of Milk

See: :Category:2000 film awards, 2000 in film, List of New Zealand feature films, Cinema of New Zealand, :Category:2000 films

Internet
See: NZ Internet History

Sport
 See: 2000 in sports, :Category:2000 in sports

Athletics
Mark Hutchinson wins his third national title in the men's marathon, clocking 2:24:58 on 29 October in Auckland, while Melissa Moon claims her first in the women's championship (2:45:42).

Basketball
 The NBL was won by the Auckland Stars who beat the Nelson Giants, 95–78 in the final.
 The Women’s NBL was won by the Otago Breakers, who beat Waikato in the final, 75-69
 The Tall Blacks lost all five pool games at the Olympic Men's tournament, then beat Angola in the classification game to finish 11th out of 12 teams.
 The Tall Ferns lost all five pool games at the Olympic Women's tournament, then beat Senegal in the classification game to finish 11th out of 12 teams.

Cricket
New Zealand cricket team
The State Championship was won by the Northern Districts Knights

Golf
 New Zealand Open, :Category:New Zealand golfers in overseas tournaments.

Horse racing

Harness racing
 New Zealand Trotting Cup: Yulestar
 Auckland Trotting Cup: Flight South

Thoroughbred racing

Netball
Silver Ferns
National Bank Cup

Olympic Games

 New Zealand sends a team of 151 competitors.
 The medal tally is considered very disappointing and sparks a review of high-performance sports training programmes.

Paralympics

 New Zealand sends a team of 43 competitors.

Rugby league

 The inaugural Bartercard Cup was won by the Canterbury Bulls who defeated the Otahuhu Leopards 38–24 in the grand final.
 The Auckland Warriors finished 13th of 14 teams in the NRL. The club was under severe financial pressure until purchased by Eric Watson after the season had ended and rebranded as the New Zealand Warriors.
27 April, New Zealand lost to Australia 0–52.
New Zealand competed in the 2000 Rugby League World Cup, losing to Australia 12–40 in the final.

Rugby union
:Category:Rugby union in New Zealand, Super 12, National Provincial Championship, :Category:All Blacks, Bledisloe Cup, Tri Nations Series, Ranfurly Shield

Shooting
Ballinger Belt – John Whiteman (Upper Hutt)

Soccer
 The New Zealand National Soccer League was relaunched as a winter competition with 10 teams and finals playoffs. The winner was Napier City Rovers.
 New Zealand placed second to Australia at the OFC Nations Cup tournament held in Tahiti
 The Chatham Cup is won by Napier City Rovers who beat Central United 4–1 in the final.

Births

January–June
 4 January – Veronica Wall, rower
 9 January – Olivia McTaggart, pole vaulter
 28 January – Zac Reid, swimmer
 30 January – Benee, singer-songwriter
 1 February – Llew Johnson, cricketer
 7 February – Nadia Olla, association footballer
 16 February – Matthew Palmer, association footballer
 21 March – Max Chu, cricketer
 24 March – Ben Lockrose, cricketer
 1 May – Elijah Just, association footballer
 5 May – Hannah Blake, association footballer
 28 May – Risi Pouri-Lane, rugby sevens player
 29 May – Chloe McMillan, freestyle skier
 8 June – Jarrod McKay, cricketer
 21 June – Dylan Brown, rugby league player
 23 June – Starford To'a, rugby league player

July–December
 10 July – Max Mata, association footballer
 26 July – Thomasin McKenzie, actor
 29 July – Marcus Armstrong, motor racing driver
 2 August – Madeline Stewart, motor racing driver
 27 August – Shylah Waikai, boxer
 8 September – Spencer Leniu, rugby league player
 21 September – Vengeance of Rain. Thoroughbred racehorse
 27 September – Liberato Cacace, association footballer
 5 October – Glamour Puss, Thoroughbred racehorse
 13 October – Amelia Kerr, cricketer
 21 October – Starcraft, Thoroughbred racehorse
 26 October – Cut The Cake, Thoroughbred racehorse
 12 December – Imogen Ayris, pole vaulter
 20 December – Kyle Chen, boxer
 29 December – Bernadette Doyle, water polo player
 30 December – Tayla Alexander, singer

Deaths

January–March
 23 January
 George Hoskins, athlete (born 1928)
 Bill Sutton, artist (born 1917)
 28 January – Lauris Edmond, poet and writer (born 1924)
 12 February – Ray Hrstich, professional wrestler (born 1920)
 16 February – Ian Lythgoe, public servant (born 1914)
 19 February – Friedensreich Hundertwasser, artist, and architect (born 1928)
 2 March – Roger Capey, field hockey player (born 1945)
 4 March – Michael Noonan, novelist and scriptwriter (born 1921)
 16 March – Connie Purdue, trade unionist, anti-abortion activist (born 1912)
 18 March – Tom Ah Chee, businessman (born 1928)
 19 March – Alison Duff, sculptor (born 1914)
 20 March – Dame Ruth Kirk, anti-abortion campaigner, wife of Norman Kirk (born 1922)
 24 March – Rod MacKenzie, rugby union player (born 1909)

April–June
 1 April – Dorothy Freed, author, composer and music historian (born 1919)
 8 April – A. K. Grant, writer, satirist (born 1941)
 12 April – Ronald Lockley, ornithologist, naturalist, author (born 1903)
 17 April – Beau Zam, Throroughbred racehorse and sire (foaled 1984)
 24 April
 John Beck, cricketer (born 1934)
 Pru Chapman, swimmer (born 1950)
 30 April – Gwen Rix, diver (born 1918)
 11 May – Gwyn Evans, association footballer (born 1935)
 12 May – Dave Crowe, cricketer (born 1933)
 14 May – Graeme Nesbitt, music, arts and radio promoter (born 1950)
 30 May – Maurie Robertson, rugby league player and coach (born 1925)
 31 May – Jock Barnes, trade unionist (born 1907)
 1 June – Angela Annabell, musicologist (born 1929)
 8 June – Lucy Cranwell, botanist (born 1907)
 10 June – Archibald Graham, cricketer (born 1917)
 11 June – Guy Bowers, rugby union player (born 1932)
 17 June – Alex Moir, cricketer (born 1919)

July–September
 1 July – Ray Forster, arachnologist, museum administrator (born 1922)
 7 July – Dame Stella Casey, social issues campaigner (born 1924)
 10 July – Norma Wilson, athlete (born 1909)
 12 July – Peter Langloh Donkin, air force officer (born 1913)
 24 July – Basil Dowling, poet (born 1910)
 27 July – John Stoke, occupational health pioneer (born 1928)
 3 September – Gordon Burgess, cricket player and administrator (born 1918)
 13 September – Ronald Hemi, rugby union and cricket player (born 1933)
 19 September – Humphrey Gould, rower, businessman (born 1927)
 26 September – Maurice Heenan, lawyer, public servant (born 1912)

October–December
 3 October – Herbert Moyle, cricketer (born 1922)
 8 October – Harold Cameron, cricketer (born 1912)
 10 October – Ken Bloxham, rugby union player (born 1954)
 18 October – Bruce Biggs, Māori language academic (born 1921)
 20 October – Ken Deas, cricketer (born 1927)
 21 October – Alan Rowe, actor (born 1926)
 22 October
 Iosefa Enari, opera singer (born 1954)
 Sir Joseph Ongley, cricket player and administrator, jurist (born 1918)
 30 October – Norman Henderson, cricketer (born 1913)
 8 November – Patricia Bartlett, pro-censorship activist (born 1928)
 9 November – Bos Murphy, boxer (born 1924)
 19 November – Pearl Savin, cricketer (born 1914)
 21 November – Frank Dennis, cricketer (born 1907)
 26 November – James Austin, meteorology academic (born 1915)
 18 December – Stan Fox, motor racing driver (born 1952)
 28 December – Douglas Bagnall, air force officer (born 1918)

See also
List of years in New Zealand
Timeline of New Zealand history
History of New Zealand
Military history of New Zealand
Timeline of the New Zealand environment
Timeline of New Zealand's links with Antarctica

References

External links

 
New Zealand
Years of the 20th century in New Zealand
2000s in New Zealand
New Zealand